William Wolfe Cohen (September 6, 1874 – October 12, 1940) was an American businessman and politician who served one term as a U.S. Representative from New York from 1927 to 1929.

Biography
Born in Brooklyn, New York to Russian-born Bernard Cohen and German-born Frederica (née Cronocher), Cohen attended public schools.

Banking business 
He became associated with his father in the shoe manufacturing business until 1903, when he engaged in the banking and brokerage business. Cohen was a member of the New York Stock Exchange and director of the New York Cotton Exchange.
He served as vice chairman of the Public Schools Athletic League, and was an honorary deputy chief of the New York City Fire Department.

Tenure in Congress 
Cohen was elected as a Democrat to the Seventieth Congress (March 4, 1927 – March 3, 1929).  He was not a candidate for renomination in 1928.

Later career and death 
He resumed his former business pursuits in New York City until his death there on October 12, 1940.  In keeping with his Jewish faith, Cohen was interred in Mount Neboh Cemetery, Brooklyn, New York.

See also
List of Jewish members of the United States Congress

References

External links

1874 births
1940 deaths
American people of German-Jewish descent
American people of Russian-Jewish descent
American stockbrokers
Jewish American bankers
Jewish members of the United States House of Representatives
New York Stock Exchange people
Democratic Party members of the United States House of Representatives from New York (state)